Wolves is a 2014 Canadian action horror film written and directed by David Hayter, and starring Lucas Till, Stephen McHattie, John Pyper-Ferguson, Merritt Patterson and Jason Momoa. The film received a negative critical response.

Plot
Cayden, an average teenage boy approaches the end of high school. During a football game, a rival player headbutts Cayden, causing the latter to become enraged and attack the player with superhuman strength. Cayden later hurts his girlfriend, Lisa, when the passion of making out causes him to transform into a werewolf. After waking up covered in blood and surrounded by the dismembered bodies of his parents, Cayden flees.

Cayden becomes a drifter, trying to keep his lycanthropy under control. In a roadside bar, Cayden draws the attention of Wild Joe, who reveals himself to be a werewolf. Wild Joe explains that werewolves come in two types, purebreds and bitten. The bitten are more savage and do not give birth to werewolf children. Purebreds are natural-born werewolves from a small number of werewolf families that came to North America with the early settlers. Cayden has only recently discovered that he was adopted, and Wild Joe confirms that they are both natural werewolves and that Cayden can find out more in a remote town called Lupine Ridge.

Cayden travels to Lupine Ridge and goes to a local bar, attracting hostile attention from the small-town locals. Cayden is attracted to Angel (Angelina), the beautiful young owner of the bar. He is eventually driven out of the bar by the locals, and outside meets John Tollerman, who hires Cayden as a farmhand. After working for Tollerman for a while, he heads into town one night and Cayden is approached by a wolf of his bloodline who understands who Cayden is, warning him to leave town and that he is in danger. Cayden's "cousin" is then killed by Connor, the alpha werewolf whom Cayden saw as the ringleader of the patrons in Angel's bar. Cayden runs into Angel, and together they witness Connor and his pack eating Cayden's cousin after the murder.

John later tells Cayden of his origins, about his werewolf mother, Lucinda, who was John's niece. Connor had seen her and had fallen in love with her. Connor knew the tension between the packs so he had raped her. Only John and his wife knew about Lucinda's resulting pregnancy, and Lucinda killed herself shortly after Cayden's birth.  The peace comes with the condition that Connor can mate with Angel as he desires a son, not knowing about Cayden.

Cayden has started a relationship with Angel and wants to cancel the town's arrangement, but the town werewolves fear what the more bestial mountain werewolves would do in retaliation. Cayden goes to the mountains to confront Connor and reveals who he is, but Connor is skeptical and unleashes his wolves on Cayden. While Cayden is stronger than the individual bitten wolves, he will not use lethal force and is overwhelmed by the pack. He manages to jump off a nearby cliff to escape.

Cayden and John form a plan to deal with the mountain pack. Before they can act, Connor kidnaps Angel and readies to mate with her. Cayden kills two of the pack and lures the others into a trap where he and John use explosives to kill them all. When Cayden then beats Connor in a single battle, Connor reveals that he and Lucinda were in love; but he created the rape story because Lucinda's father was going to kill her for the relationship.

Wild Joe suddenly appears, telling Connor and Cayden that he planned the events all along, killing Cayden's adoptive parents and convincing him to go to Lupine Ridge so that he could kill Connor in revenge for his own past issues with Connor. Wild Joe kills Connor but is killed by Cayden.

Cayden decides to leave with Angel to see the world, but he promises John they will be back. John gives him a scroll showing the bloodlines of the purebred werewolves to help him find others during their journey.

Cast

Reception
On Rotten Tomatoes, the film has an approval rating of 20% based on 20 reviews. On Metacritic the film has a score of 37% based on reviews from 11 critics, indicating "generally unfavorable reviews".

Shock Till You Drop and the New York Times both panned the film, with Shock Till You Drop stating that the film took itself too seriously and "as a result it comes across as, well again…silly. Also, there's a sleazy, date-rapey angle to the film that undermines any potential for fun this film could have had."

References

External links
 

2014 films
2014 directorial debut films
2014 horror films
2010s action horror films
Canadian action horror films
Canadian werewolf films
English-language Canadian films
Entertainment One films
Films with screenplays by David Hayter
2010s English-language films
2010s Canadian films
Copperheart Entertainment films